William Bromley (26 June 1656 – 5 August 1707) was an English Whig politician, MP for Worcester and Worcestershire.

Bromley was the son of Henry Bromley  and his wife Mercy Pytts, daughter of Edward Pytts .

He matriculated at Christ Church, Oxford, in 1673, aged 17, and entered the Middle Temple in 1674.

Bromley served as MP for Worcester 1685–1700, and became a consistent supporter of the Whig Junto of Sir John Somers, for a time his fellow MP for Worcester.

Bromley was elected knight of the shire for Worcestershire in November 1701. He was defeated in 1702 – he declared himself "in a melancholy way since the election", and blamed the defeat on poor Whig party management. He was re-elected in 1705, serving until his death on 5 August 1707.

Family
On 25 April 1675 he married Margaret Berkeley, daughter of Sir Rowland Berkeley . They had three daughters, of which two outlived Bromley as his co-heirs:
 Mercy Bromley, married John Bromley 
 Dorothy Bromley, married firstly Clobery Bromley , secondly John Jennings of Hayes

References

1656 births
1707 deaths
Alumni of Christ Church, Oxford
Members of the Middle Temple
Whig members of the pre-1707 English Parliament
English MPs 1685–1687
English MPs 1689–1690
English MPs 1690–1695
English MPs 1695–1698
English MPs 1698–1700
English MPs 1701–1702
English MPs 1705–1707
Members of the Parliament of England for Worcestershire